This is a list of people who have taken part in the jury of the International Chopin Piano Competition since its foundation in 1927.

The name of the chairperson is written in bold.

I (1927)

II (1932)

III (1937)

IV (1949)

V (1955)

VI (1960)

VII (1965)

VIII (1970)

IX (1975)

X (1980)

XI (1985)

XII (1990)

XIII (1995)

XIV (2000)

XV (2005)

XVI (2010)

XVII (2015)

XVIII (2021)

Further reading 
 
 
 

jury